Constantin Tănase (24 June 1949 – 30 October 2014) was a journalist and former politician from Moldova, member of the Moldovan Parliament between 1990 and 1994.

Biography 

Tănase was the director of the Timpul de dimineață. Timpul de dimineață disfavored, directly or indirectly, the Party of Communists of the Republic of Moldova and the Christian-Democratic People's Party (Moldova).

He was a leader of the Democratic Forum of Romanians in Moldova.

See also 
 Union of Journalists of Moldova

References

External links 
 timpul.md
  Eseu Opriti-l pe Dabija.

2014 deaths
Members of the parliament of Moldova
Moldovan journalists
Male journalists
Moldovan anti-communists
Moldovan MPs 1990–1994
Popular Front of Moldova MPs
Recipients of the Order of the Republic (Moldova)
1949 births
Moldovan philologists